Le Pavillon may refer to:

 Le Pavillon (Henri Soulé restaurant), run by Henri Soulé
 Le Pavillon (Daniel Boulud restaurant), run by Daniel Boulud

Similar titles
 Le Pavillon Hotel in New Orleans
 Le Pavillon brûle, a 1941 French comedy drama film
 Le Pavillon-Sainte-Julie, a commune in France
 Le Pavillon d'Armide, a ballet